The 2017–18 Champions Hockey League was the fourth season of the Champions Hockey League, a European ice hockey tournament. The tournament was reduced to 32 teams, and qualification was on sporting merits only. The six founding leagues are represented by between three and five teams (based on a three-year league ranking), while seven "challenge leagues" are represented by one team each. One place was reserved for the Continental Cup champion. Unlike in the three previous editions, founding teams did not automatically qualify. The season concluded with the final on 6 February 2018 at Vida Arena where JYP beat Växjö Lakers 2–0, becoming the first non-Swedish team to win the title.

Team allocation 
A total of 32 teams from different European first-tier leagues participate in the 2017–18 Champions Hockey League. Besides the Continental Cup champions, 24 teams from the six founding leagues, as well as the national champions from Slovakia, Norway, Denmark, France, Belarus, the United Kingdom and Poland qualified.

The qualification for these places was set out in the rules as follows:
 National league champion (play-off winners)
 Regular season winners
 Regular season runner-up
 Losing play-off finalist
 Higher regular season ranked losing semi-finalist
 Lower regular season ranked losing semi-finalist
 Third placed team in regular season
 Fourth placed team in regular season
 Fifth placed team in regular season.

Teams

Group stage

For the group stage, the teams were drawn into 8 groups of 4 teams. Each team plays home and away against every other team for a total of 6 games. The best 2 teams qualify to the round of 16.

As the reigning CHL champions, Frölunda HC was the top seeded team. In the top pot were also the reigning champions of the six founding leagues and the regular season winner of SHL, Växjö Lakers. The 16 remaining teams from founding leagues were placed to pots 2 and 3. The fourth pot included playoff champions of seven challenge leagues and Nottingham Panthers, the champion of 2016–17 IIHF Continental Cup.

Group stage tie-breaking criteria

If two teams are tied in points after the group stage is finished, the teams precedence is decided by head-to-head games. If teams are tied after that, then the team which was ranked higher prior to the tournament took precedence. When comparing head-to-head results, the following criteria was applied:

 more points in games against the other tied team
 better goal difference in games against the other tied team
 more goals scored against the other tied team
 more goals scored in a single game against the other tied team
If the head-to-head games between teams ended as draws after regulation, this additional criterion was applied:
 overtime wins against the other tied team
If the head-to-head games between teams ended with game winning shots, this additional criterion was applied:
 more goals scored in the two game winning shot competitions
If teams are still tied, the higher position in the 2016–17 CHL club ranking was decided about precedence.

Group A

Group B

Group C

Group D

Group E

Group F

Group G

Group H

Playoffs

Qualified teams

Format 

In each round except the final, the teams played two games and the aggregate score was decided the team which advances. As a rule, the first leg was hosted by the team who had inferior record in the tournament so far and the second leg was played on the home ice of the other team. If aggregate score is tied, a sudden death overtime followed. If the overtime is scoreless, the team who wins the game winning shot competition advances.

The final was played on the home ice of team who had better record in the tournament on February 6, 2018.

Bracket 

The eight group winners and the eight second-placed teams advanced to the Round of 16. The teams were divided into two seeding groups and group winners were randomly drawn against runners-up. Teams who had faced each other in the group stage could not be drawn against each other in the round of 16. The draw took place in Helsinki, Finland on October 13, 2017.

Note:
The teams listed on top of each tie were runners up in the group stage and play the first leg at home. The bottom team were group winners and play the second leg at home. Due to conflicting schedules however, both Malmö Redhawks and Adler Mannheim ended up playing their first legs at home.
The order of the legs (what team starts at home) in the future rounds may be changed as the team with best record should have second match at home.

Round of 16 
The draw for the entire playoff was held on 13 October 2017 in Helsinki. The first legs were played on 31 October with return legs played the following week.

|}

Quarter-finals 
First legs were played on 5 December, return legs were played on 12 December.

|}

Semi-finals 
First legs were played on 9 January, return legs were played on 16 January 2018.

|}

Final 
The final was played on 6 February 2018.

Statistics

Scoring leaders

Source: championshockeyleague.net

Leading goaltenders
Only the top five goaltenders, based on save percentage, who have played at least 40% of their team's minutes, are included in this list.

Source: championshockeyleague.net

References 

 
Champions Hockey League seasons
1